Der Dicke was a German criminal drama television series. After the death of actor Dieter Pfaff, who portrayed the protagonist, the series was renamed  (The Law Firm), with Herbert Knaup as the new lead actor.

See also
 List of German television series

References

External links
 

2005 German television series debuts
2012 German television series endings
German-language television shows
Das Erste original programming
German legal television series